Culliton is a surname. Notable people with the surname include: 

Brandon Culliton, Canadian film director
Carolyn Culliton (née DeMoney), American daytime serial writer
E. M. Culliton (1906–1991), member of Legislative Assembly of Saskatchewan, Chief Justice of Saskatchewan
Lucy Culliton (born 1966), Australian artist
Richard Culliton, American television writer

See also
Calton (disambiguation)
Cleiton (disambiguation)
Colton (disambiguation)
Coulton (disambiguation)